Cieślewicz is a Polish surname. Notable people with this surname include:

 Adrian Cieślewicz (born 1990), Polish footballer
 Anna Borucka-Cieślewicz (born 1941), Polish politician
 Dave Cieslewicz (born 1959), American politician
 Ewa Wiśnierska née Cieślewicz (born 1971), Polish-German paraglider
 Łukasz Cieślewicz (born 1987), Polish footballer
 Roman Cieślewicz (1930–1996), Polish-French artist

See also
 

Polish-language surnames